Baghelkhand is a proposed state and a mountain range in central India that covers the northeastern regions of Madhya Pradesh and a small area of southeastern Uttar Pradesh.Baghel is a Rajput clan that are descendants from the Vaghela dynasty of Gujarat, which was an offshoot of the Chaulukya (Solanki) dynasty, ruling Gujarat in the 13th century CE. They were the last Hindu and Rajput dynasty to rule Gujarat before the Muslim conquest of the region.

History

Dahala
Baghelkhand was known as Dahala 6th–12th century, Kalachuri dynasty with stronghold at Kalinjar Fort. The area got its current name after Vaghela Rajput kings in the 14th century, later it was absorbed state.

Bagelkhand Agency
The Bagelkhand Agency was a British political unit which managed the relations of the British with a number of autonomous princely states existing outside British India, namely  Rewa and 11 minor states, of which the most prominent were Maihar, Nagod and Sohawal. Other principalities included Jaso, Kothi, Baraundha (aka Patharkachhar) as well as the Kalinjar Chaubes, consisting of the princely estates of Paldeo, Kamta-Rajaula, Tarauwhan, Pahra and Bhaisaunda.

Geography
Baghelkhand is surrounded by the Indo-Gangetic plains in the north and east, Bundelkhand in the west and the Vindhya range in the south.

Administration
Currently it divided between Madhya Pradesh and Uttar Pradesh. It includes the Madhya Pradesh districts  Rewa, Satna, Shahdol,  Sidhi of Madhya Pradesh and Chitrakoot of Uttar Pradesh.

Demographics
The inhabitants of Baghelkhand

References 

Regions of Madhya Pradesh
Regions of Uttar Pradesh
Regions of India